Jan van den Broek (8 June 1907 – 7 November 1964) was a Dutch footballer. He played in eleven matches for the Netherlands national football team from 1927 to 1933.

References

External links
 

1907 births
1964 deaths
Dutch footballers
Netherlands international footballers
Footballers from Breda
Association football forwards
NAC Breda players
PSV Eindhoven players
Dutch football managers
PSV Eindhoven managers